What the Golf? (stylized in all caps as WHAT THE GOLF?) is a video game developed and published by Triband. It was originally published on Apple Arcade subscription by The Label on 19 September 2019.

Gameplay 

The game revolves around completing levels to progress on the world map. The goal of each level is to reach the hole. Every level of the game has a twist on traditional golf. Each section of the world map has its own theme, which the level's unique mechanics follow.

Development
What the Golf was crowdfunded through American crowdfunding website Fig. The developers chose golf as the sport to ridicule, saying that it was "mostly played by rich people, so it seemed like a safe target". The levels in the game were designed to be short, to be able to try as many jokes as possible. Much of the game's humor is based around slapstick, as it was seen as a form of comedy that would work regardless of where the player was. The game's crown system was designed to make players revisit levels and for people who wanted to complete everything. The developers considered having unlockable skins for the golf ball, but the idea ended up being scrapped. The slow-motion feature was originally intended for the game's soccer level, but it was added to the rest of the game.

Release 
What the Golf released on 19 September 2019 for iOS, iPadOS, and MacOS on Apple Arcade. A macOS version separate from Apple Arcade and a Windows port launched through the Epic Games Store on 1 October 2019. A Nintendo Switch port was released on 21 May 2020. A physical Nintendo Switch release was sold through Iam8bit alongside a vinyl soundtrack. A Steam version was released on 22 October 2020.

Reception

What the Golf received "generally favorable" reviews, according to review aggregator Metacritic. Sergio Velasquez of TouchArcade praised the element of surprise the game presented. Jordan Devore of Destructoid appreciated the game's comedic value. Christopher Livingston, writing for PC Gamer, while also praising the comedy, enjoyed both the soundtrack and the challenge each level brought. However, James O'Connor of GameSpot did not enjoy the differences between the Windows and Apple editions.

Awards

References

External links

2019 video games
Golf video games
Video games developed in Denmark
Windows games
Indie video games
Nintendo Switch games
Apple Arcade games
iOS games
Single-player video games